Leonards was an unincorporated community in Calhoun County, Florida, United States. It is located along State Road 71 near Calhoun County Airport

Unincorporated communities in Calhoun County, Florida
Unincorporated communities in Florida